Progreso is a corregimiento in Barú District, Chiriquí Province, Panama. Its population as of 1990 was 13,107; its population as of 2000 was 10,103. Its inhabitants are mainly engaged in planting and harvesting Rice.

References

Corregimientos of Chiriquí Province